In mathematics, the generalized Pochhammer symbol of parameter  and partition  generalizes the classical Pochhammer symbol, named after Leo August Pochhammer, and is defined as

It is used in multivariate analysis.

References

Gamma and related functions
Factorial and binomial topics